Azteca barbifex is a species of ant in the genus Azteca. Described by Auguste-Henri Forel in 1906, the species is endemic to North America and South America.

References

Azteca (genus)
Hymenoptera of North America
Hymenoptera of South America
Insects described in 1906